was a Japanese Marxist and one of the most important theoreticians of the Japanese Communist Party during the 1920s.

Biography 

Fukumoto was born in Tottori Prefecture to a moderately prosperous landowning family. He studied law at Tokyo Imperial University and became a lecturer at a high school after graduation. In 1922 he was sent to Europe to study law; there he familiarized himself with Marxism and joined the Communist Party of Germany. When he returned home in 1924 he joined a small communist group and became an editor for a small magazine simply called Marxism.

Fukumoto wrote numerous articles and was well known in left-wing circles for his interpretations of Marxism-Leninism and his criticism of other Japanese Marxist scholars, especially Yamakawa Hitoshi and Kawakami Hajime. His writing style was considered complex and he was more interested in the theoretical than the practical aspects of Socialism. Fukumoto called for the separation of true Marxist from false Marxists and urged the true Marxists to concentrate on theoretical struggle. This approach was popular among young intellectuals and was called Fukumotoism, as opposed to the more pragmatic mass-based approach of Yamakawa called Yamakawaism.

Fukumoto's main contribution was to improve the theoretical foundation of the communist party and the revolution, though he also expressed the idea that excessive focus on theory could isolate the party from other left-wing groups. Eventually the Cominterm took the view that this was happening and in 1927 it issued a thesis attacking both Yamakawa and Fukumoto and demanding that the party strive for an immediate two-stage revolution to overthrow the Japanese government, and especially the Emperor system and Diet of Japan, redistribution of wealth, and pursue a favourable policy with the USSR.

References 

 Beckmann, George M. Okubo, Genji. The Japanese Communist Party 1922-1945, Stanford: Stanford University Press, 1969; pp. 107-109.

1894 births
1983 deaths
Japanese Marxists